Bael (Ba’al or Baal) is a demon described in demonological grimoires such as The Lesser Key of Solomon and the Pseudomonarchia Daemonum (where he is the first spirit mentioned) and also in the Dictionnaire Infernal.  He is described as a hoarsely-voiced king with the power to make men invisible and ruling over sixty-six legions of demons.  The Lesser Key of Solomon describes him as appearing in the form of a cat, toad, man, some combination thereof, or other "divers shapes", while the Pseudomonarchia Daemonum 

Jacques Collin de Plancy wonders if Bael is the same as the Canaanite deity Baal, a reasonable assumption.  In the Livre des Esperitz, Bael (as Beal) is described as a king ruled by Oriens (himself a demon overseeing the cardinal direction east, or the Orient), still possessing the power of invisibility, as well as the power to garner the favor of others, but ruling over only six (rather than sixty-six) legions of demons.  The Liber Officium Spirituum features Baal, Baall, Boal, or Boall, again a hoarsely-voiced king (or sometimes a soldier), with not only powers of invisibility but also sciences and love.  Sloane MS 3824 mentions Baal, in "Of the Demon Rulers", as a king ruled by Oriens, attributed with teaching science, (again) granting invisibility, and controlling 250 legions of spirits. Bael appears in later editions of The Grimoire of Pope Honorius, under Astaroth, as a prince whose powers include (again) invisibility and popularity.  In the Grand Grimoire, Bael (as Baal) is listed as a subordinate of Lucifuge Rofocale.  According to Thomas Rudd, Bael is opposed by the Shemhamphorasch angel Vehuiah.

Explanatory footnotes

References

Further reading 
S. L. MacGregor Mathers, A. Crowley, The Goetia: The Lesser Key of Solomon the King (1904). 1995 reprint: .

Baal
Goetic demons